Sya is a locality in Sweden.

SYA may refer to:

Southwestern Youth Association, an American youth sports league for Centreville and Clifton, Virginia
School Year Abroad, an American school which places pupil in a school abroad for an academic year
SupportYourApp, a Ukrainian technology company
IATA airport code for Eareckson Air Station in Alaska

See also 
 Siya